Cyanobacterin is a chemical compound produced by the cyanobacteria Scytonema hofmanni. It is a photosynthesis inhibitor with algaecidal and herbicidal effects.

References

Cyanotoxins
Algaecides
Herbicides
Tertiary alcohols
Benzodioxoles
Chloroarenes
Halogen-containing natural products
Isopropyl compounds
Lactones
Haloalkenes